The Youth Organisation Freedom and Democracy (JOVD) is a Dutch political youth organisation. The JOVD cooperates with the People's Party for Freedom and Democracy (VVD), but is politically independent. 

Having trained several well-known members of the House of Representatives and ministers (including Prime Minister Mark Rutte), the JOVD is a highly-regarded political school. The JOVD is a member of the European Liberal Youth (LYMEC) and the International Federation of Liberal Youth (IFLRY).

References

External links
Official website

1949 establishments in the Netherlands
Youth organizations established in 1949
People's Party for Freedom and Democracy
Liberalism in the Netherlands
Youth wings of political parties in the Netherlands
Youth wings of liberal parties
Organisations based in The Hague